Nick Brophy is an American mixer, sound engineer, record producer and songwriter. The artists he has collaborated with and written for include Jason Aldean, the Rolling Stones, Avril Lavigne, Hootie & the Blowfish, Kenny Chesney, Carly Simon, Taylor Swift, Garbage and Everclear. His engineering credits include Everclear's platinum Sparkle and Fade, Avril Lavigne's 6× platinum Let Go and the Rolling Stones 4× platinum 40 Licks. His mixing credits include three consecutive #1 singles by Kip Moore; 2× platinum Somethin' 'Bout a Truck, certified gold Beer Money and platinum Hey Pretty Girl, as well as  Jimmy Fallon's Blow Your Pants Off, for which he won a Grammy. His songwriting credits include recordings by Hootie & the Blowfish, Jason Aldean, Kenny Chesney and Rascal Flatts.

History
Brophy was born in St. Louis, Missouri but grew up all over the world. He spent time overseas in Japan, Greece, Egypt as well as many states in the U.S., eventually settling in Southern California. He began playing guitar at age 13 and was in several SoCal bands before joining Aircraft, a local band out of San Diego consisting of Ronnie Jones, Larry Madison, Rob Lamothe and Alan DeSilva. Aircraft relocated to Los Angeles where it performed shows at Hollywood's Whisky a Go Go, Troubadour, Gazzarri's, the Roxy and other venues. After disbanding in 1987, drummer Alan DeSilva contacted Lamothe and Brophy to form a new band.

Career

Riverdogs
In 1988, together with DeSilva and Lamothe, Brophy formed the Riverdogs. Then Whitesnake guitarist, Vivian Campbell was helping produce the group's demos and later left to join the Riverdogs. In February 1989, Riverdogs signed to  Tony Martell's imprint label Epic Associated Records and began pre-production on its debut album “Riverdogs” which was released in June 1990. The album was critically lauded and received Holland's Edison Award for best hard rock album of 1991. Campbell left the band in November 1990 and later joined Def Leppard. After 2 follow-up albums, 1992's “Absolutely Live” and 1993's “Bone”, the Riverdogs disbanded. During the making of “Bone”, Brophy assumed the role of engineer and in 1994 began engineering at the newly built Rondor Music Publishing studios in West Los Angeles.

Rondor Music
In 1994, after 3 months of working as an assistant engineer, Brophy was promoted to head engineer by Herb Alpert. During his 5 years at Rondor, Brophy engineered alongside veteran producers Lou Adler (the Mamas & the Papas, Carole King), Richard Perry (Harry Nilsson, Barbra Streisand, Art Garfunkel), Bones Howe (Elvis Presley, Tom Waits, the Fifth Dimension) and contemporary producers Greg Wells (Katy Perry, Adele, One Republic), Jay Joyce (Wallflowers, Patty Griffin, Eric Church) as well as writers and artists Michael Masser, Gerry Goffin, Olivia Newton-John, Everclear, and Garbage. While at Rondor, Brophy was signed to EMI Music Publishing and had international success with records by Trine Rein, Momoko, Jill Johnson, and Coco Lee as well as film and TV placements including ABC's "Wasteland" (theme song),> Eddie Murphy's “Pluto Nash”(movie trailer) and a song on the motion picture soundtrack for "The Wedding Planner".

World's End
In 2001, Brophy signed to World's End Producer Management. In Sept of 2001 he worked with the production team The Matrix on Avril Lavigne's “Let Go” album which eventually sold over 6 million copies. The following year Brophy engineered 3 albums with producer Don Was, which included Hootie & the Blowfish “Hootie & the Blowfish”, the Rolling Stones “40 Licks” and Carly Simon “Christmas Is Almost Here”. During his time at Worlds End, Nick worked on albums with producers Dave Sardy, Paul Lani and Was as well as producing an album for Warner Australia artist “Mishelle Bradford-Jones".

Nashville
In 2003, at the suggestion of friend and country artist Phil Vassar, Brophy re-located to Nashville, Tennessee. He arrived and began co-producing Phil Vassar's “Shaken Not Stirred”. In Nashville Nick has written, produced, engineered and mixed albums and singles with; Vassar, Taylor Swift, Jennifer Hanson, Hootie & the Blowfish, the JaneDear Girls, Kip Moore, Big & Rich, Jimmy Fallon and many others. Nick's work as a mixer has earned him several number 1's as well as Fallon's “Blow Your Pants Off” winning a Grammy for best comedy album.

Cornman Music
From 2015 to 2017 Brophy was a songwriter for Cornman Music, Brett James' publishing co-venture with Warner/Chappell Music. During this time he had recordings by Jason Aldean, Kenny Chesney, Rascall Flatts, Brooke Eden and The McClymonts.

LÒNIS
In 2018, Brophy teamed up with Jennifer Hanson to form the writing and production duo LÒNIS. Since then LÒNIS has cuts and production credits with multiple artists, and placements in film and television. Their songs have been heard on ABC, NBC, FOX, CMT, MTV, VH1, PBS, HGTV, The CW, Freeform, Netflix, Discovery Channel, Cox Communications, Hulu, Paramount+, TV Land, Showtime and in films and movie trailers for Sony, Columbia, Disney and Warner Bros Pictures. Notable placements have been Grey's Anatomy, The Bold Type, Younger, Selling Sunset, Station 19, Songland, Emily In Paris, Ghosted, A Million Little Things, My Kitchen Rules, Deadliest Catch, America's Got Talent, America's Funniest Home Videos, Astrid & Raphaëlle and Restored By The Fords, as well as in national and international advertising campaigns and promo spots for Xbox, Target, Ford, Coors Light and AdventHealth. LÒNIS has the title track in the Disney film Magic Camp and also a featured song in the Kristen Bell comedy Queenpins.

Discography

Certified RIAA

Grammy Related Works

References

External links
Nick Brophy.com
Riverdogs News

Record producers from Missouri
American audio engineers
Living people
People from St. Louis
Songwriters from Missouri
Year of birth missing (living people)